John Dryburgh Godsell (13 September 1924 – 29 March 2014) was a Scottish professional footballer, who played as a full back.

Career
Born in Lassodie, Godsell played for Forfar Athletic, St. Huddersfield Town, Bradford City, Southport and Gainsborough Trinity.

He made 9 appearances for Bradford City in the Football League.

References

1924 births
2014 deaths
Scottish footballers
Forfar Athletic F.C. players
Huddersfield Town A.F.C. players
Bradford City A.F.C. players
Southport F.C. players
Gainsborough Trinity F.C. players
English Football League players
Association football fullbacks
Footballers from Fife